Vincent Mangano (born Vincenzo Giovanni Mangano; ; March 28, 1888 – disappeared April 19, 1951, declared dead October 30, 1961) was an Italian-born mobster also known as "Vincent The Executioner" as named in a Brooklyn newspaper, and the head of the Mangano crime family from 1931 to 1951. He was the brother of Philip Mangano.

Vince as head of the Gambino family
Mangano was named head of what was then the Mineo family in 1931, following the Castellammarese War. He was one of the original bosses of the modern Five Families, the others being Joseph Bonanno, Lucky Luciano, Joe Profaci and Tommy Gagliano.

Mangano made the waterfront his family's main income producer. He and his associates would threaten to prevent cargo from being loaded or unloaded if the shipping company refused to pay a tribute. This effort was helped by the family's control of Brooklyn Local 1814 of the International Longshoremen's Association; its president, Anthony Anastasio, was a member of the family.

Feud with Anastasia
Despite being a mob power in his own right, Albert Anastasia was nominally the underboss of the Mangano crime family, under Mangano. During his 20-year rule, Mangano had resented Anastasia's close ties to Luciano and Costello, particularly the fact that they had obtained Anastasia's services without first seeking Mangano's permission. This and other business disputes led to heated, almost physical fights between the two mobsters.

Disappearance
Mangano's brother was found dead near Sheepshead Bay, Brooklyn on April 19, 1951. Vincent Mangano disappeared the same day. Both of them are believed to have been murdered on the orders of family underboss Albert Anastasia in Brooklyn as part of a coup in 1951. Vincent Mangano's body was never found, and he was declared dead 10 years later on October 30, 1961, by the Surrogate's Court in Brooklyn. No one was ever arrested in the Mangano homicide, but it was widely assumed that Anastasia had them killed.

See also
List of people who disappeared

References

Further reading
Bonanno, Joseph. A Man of Honor: The Autobiography of Joseph Bonanno. New York: St. Martin's Press, 2003. 
Capeci, Jerry. The Complete Idiot's Guide to the Mafia. Indianapolis: Alpha Books, 2002. 
Davis, John H. Mafia Dynasty: The Rise and Fall of the Gambino Crime Family. New York: HarperCollins, 1993. 
Jacobs, James B., Christopher Panarella and Jay Worthington. Busting the Mob: The United States Vs. Cosa Nostra. New York: NYU Press, 1994. 
Mannion, James. 101 Things You Didn't Know About The Mafia: The Lowdown on Dons, Wiseguys, Squealers and Backstabbers. Avon, Massachusetts: Adams Media, 2005. 
Milhorn, H. Thomas. Crime: Computer Viruses to Twin Towers. Boca Raton, Florida: Universal Publishers, 2005. 
Raab, Selwyn. Five Families: The Rise, Decline, and Resurgence of America's Most Powerful Mafia Empires. New York: St. Martin Press, 2005. 
Schatzberg, Rufus, Robert J. Kelly and Ko-lin Chin, ed. Handbook of Organized Crime in the United States. Westport, Connecticut: Greenwood Press, 1994. 

1888 births
1950s missing person cases
1951 deaths
1951 murders in the United States
Bosses of the Gambino crime family
Gambino crime family
Gangsters from Palermo
Italian emigrants to the United States
Murdered American gangsters of Sicilian descent
Missing gangsters
Missing person cases in New York City
Murder, Inc.
People murdered in New York (state)
Male murder victims
Prohibition-era gangsters
Unsolved murders in the United States